

This is a list of the National Register of Historic Places listings in Rock County, Wisconsin. It is intended to provide a comprehensive listing of entries in the National Register of Historic Places that are located in Rock County, Wisconsin.  The locations of National Register properties for which the latitude and longitude coordinates are included below may be seen in a map.

There are 139 properties and districts listed on the National Register in the county. Another seven properties were once listed but have been removed.

Current listings

|}

Formerly listed

|}

See also

List of National Historic Landmarks in Wisconsin
National Register of Historic Places listings in Wisconsin
Listings in neighboring counties: Boone (IL), Dane, Green, Jefferson, Walworth, Winnebago (IL)

References

External links
 Janesville's Benton Avenue Historic District: A Guide
 Janesville's Columbus Circle Historic District : A Guide
 Janesville's Court House Hill Historic District: A Guide
 Janesville's Look West Historic District: A Guide
 Main & Milwaukee, Janesville's Downtown Historic Districts: A Guide
 Janesville's Old Fourth Ward Historic District: A Guide
 Janesville's Prospect Hill & Conrad Cottages Historic Districts: A Guide

Rock